Antigonish County, Nova Scotia contains a number of communities. Many of them have Gaelic names.

Communities are ordered by the highway they are on.  All routes start with the terminus near the largest community.

Trunk Routes

Trunk 4: James River - Antigonish - Lower South River - Bayfield Road - Afton 23 - Tracadie - Monastery - Linwood
Trunk 7: Antigonish - Salt Springs - Ashdale - Glen Alpine - North Lochaber - Lochaber
Trunk 16: Monastery - Upper Big Tracadie

Arterial Highways

Highway 104: Pomquet Forks - Auld's Cove

Collector Roads

Route 245: Antigonish - North Grant - Malignant Cove - Doctors Brook - Arisaig - McArras Brook
Route 316: St. Andrews  - Frasers Mills  - Upper South River
Route 337: Antigonish - Antigonish Harbour - Morristown - Lakevale - Cape George - Ballantynes Cove - Livingstone Cove - Georgeville - Malignant Cove

Communities located on rural roads

Addington Forks
Bayfield
Big Marsh
Brierly Brook
Caledonia Mills
Clydesdale
Dunmaglass
Havre Boucher
Heatherton
Ireland
Merland
Marydale
Morar
New France
Ohio
Pomquet
Southside Antigonish Harbour
St. Joseph
West Lochaber

See also

Antigonish County